Ceratrichia hollandi is a species of butterfly in the family Hesperiidae. It is found in the Democratic Republic of the Congo, Uganda, western Kenya and north-western Tanzania. The habitat consists of forests.

References

Butterflies described in 1908
Hesperiinae